Palamangalam is a village panchayat in Narayanavanam mandal, located in Tirupati district of Andhra Pradesh, India.

In the 2011 census it had a population of 3754 in 1015 households.

References

Villages in Tirupati district